Luis Arturo González Hurtado (born August 6, 1984) is a Venezuelan Multi Champion boxer who competed in the 2008 Summer Olympics in the men's light-heavyweight division.

At the World Championships in 2007, he lost his first bout to Jahon Qurbonov.

At the Olympic qualifier, he upset Julio Castillo and Christopher Downs by RSCO (20:0), and then lost the meaningless final to Carlos Negron.

At his Olympic debut, he suffered a first round RSC to Hungarian Imre Szellő.

References
Olympic qualification
sports-reference
ESPN

1984 births
Living people
Boxers at the 2008 Summer Olympics
Olympic boxers of Venezuela
Venezuelan male boxers
Light-heavyweight boxers